Chromium sulfate may refer to:

 Chromium(II) sulfate
 Chromium(III) sulfate